Rosales is an order of flowering plants.

Rosales may also refer to:

People
 Rosales (surname)

Places
 Coronel Rosales Partido, a partido of the province of Buenos Aires
 Vicente Pérez Rosales National Park
 Rosales (Bogotá), a neighbourhood in Bogotá
 Culiacán Rosales, capital of the state of Sinaloa
 Rosales, Chihuahua, a municipality in the state of Chihuahua
 Calera de Víctor Rosales, a municipality in the state of Zacatecas
 Rosales, Pangasinan, a municipality in the province of Pangasinan

Others
 ARA Rosales (P-42), an Argentine Navy ship
 Battle of Santa Cruz de Rosales, of the Mexican–American War

See also 
 Los Rosales (disambiguation)